Euastacus jagara is a species of Australian crayfish in the family Parastacidae. It is known from only six specimens, all collected at the type locality in the Mistake Mountains in the State of Queensland, Australia. The streams inhabited by the species are surrounded by Upland Subtropical Rainforest, and drain into the Brisbane River. The species is listed as critically endangered on the IUCN Red List.

References

Freshwater crustaceans of Australia
Endangered fauna of Australia
jagara
Taxonomy articles created by Polbot
Crustaceans described in 1989